Ngāti Mutunga is a Māori iwi (tribe) of New Zealand, whose original tribal lands were in north Taranaki. They migrated from Taranaki, first to Wellington (with Ngāti Toa and other Taranaki Hāpu), and then to the Chatham Islands (along with Ngāti Tama) in the 1830s. The rohe of the iwi include Wharekauri (Chatham Island), Te Whanga Lagoon and Waitangi on Chatham Island, and Pitt Island, also part of the Chatham Islands. The principal marae are at Urenui in Taranaki, and on the Chatham Islands.

The eponymous ancestor Mutunga, from whom Ngāti Mutunga claims its lineage, is a grandfather of Toa-rangatira, the eponymous ancestor of the Ngāti Toa tribe.

“Mai Titoki ki Te Rau o Te Huia” saying, mentions their northern boundary with Ngāti Tama (Titoki), and southern boundary with Te Āti Awa (Te Rau o Te Huia).

History

Leaving Taranaki for Wellington
The original tribal lands in north Taranaki were invaded by Waikato tribes during the Musket Wars after a series of longstanding intertribal wars stretching back to at least 1807. Ngāti Mutunga in turn joined with Ngāti Toa and the smaller Ngāti Tama tribe to invade the Wellington region. Here they fought with and defeated the Ngāti Ira iwi, took over their land and extinguished their independent existence. The northern Taranaki land was under the mana of the great Waikato chief Te Wherowhero until sold to the government.

Settlement of the Chatham Islands
Ngāti Mutunga lived an uneasy existence in the modern Wellington region where they were threatened by tensions between Ngāti Toa and Ngāti Raukawa. In Te Whanganui a Tara (Wellington) they felt less than secure. They burnt the bones of their ancestors and gifted their land to Te Atiawa and Ngāti Tama. In November 1835 about 900 people of the Ngāti Mutunga and Ngāti Tama tribes migrated to the Chatham Islands on the ship Lord Rodney. They had originally planned to settle either Samoa or the Norfolk Islands but in a meeting at Wellington in 1835 decided to settle the Chatham Islands due to their proximity. The incoming Māori were received and initially cared for by the local Moriori. When it became clear that the visitors intended to stay, the Moriori withdrew to their marae at te Awapatiki. There, after holding a hui (consultation) to debate what to do about the Taranaki Māori invaders, the Moriori decided to implement a policy of non-aggression. Moriori had forgone the killing of people in the centuries leading up to the arrival of the Maori, instead settling quarrels up to 'first blood'.  This cultural practice is known as 'Nunuku's Law'.  The development of this pragmatic dispute settlement process left Moriori wholly unprepared to deal with the Ngāti Tama and Ngāti Mutunga settlers who came from a significantly different and more aggressive culture.

Ngāti Mutunga in turn saw the meeting as a precursor to warfare on the part of Moriori and responded. Ngāti Mutunga attacked and in the ensuing action massacred over 260 Moriori.  A Moriori survivor recalled: "[The Māori] commenced to kill us like sheep... [We] were terrified, fled to the bush, concealed ourselves in holes underground, and in any place to escape our enemies. It was of no avail; we were discovered and killed — men, women and children — indiscriminately." A Māori chief, Te Rakatau Katihe, said: "We took possession ... in accordance with our custom, and we caught all the people. Not one escaped. Some ran away from us, these we killed; and others also we killed — but what of that? It was in accordance with our custom." Despite the Chatham Islands being made part of New Zealand in 1842, Māori kept Moriori slaves until 1863.

Gold prospectors allowed on rohe
In the mid-1870s Ngāti Mutunga in Taranaki allowed gold prospectors to search the Mokau River valley for signs of gold. The Mokau River formed the boundary between this iwi and the Ngāti Maniapoto rohe, which was in a struggle with the Maori king (who claimed mana over Rohe Potae). Te Kooti (who had been given sanctuary by the Maniapoto fighting chief Rewi Maniapoto, against the express wishes of the Maori king), was allowed to go to the river mouth for seafood. Te Kooti tried to form an alliance with a local hapu to drive out the prospectors and their Ngati Mutunga guardians.

Treaty of Waitangi claims settlement for Taranaki
During the conflict in Taranaki over land in the 1860s and subsequently, Ngāti Mutunga left en masse from the Chatham Islands, joined with other iwi in rebelling against the Crown's decision to purchase land from Maori. This led to at least 23 Ngāti Mutunga taking part in the Parihaka occupation of disputed land and their subsequent arrest. In 1865 Ngāti Mutunga land was confiscated under the New Zealand Settlements Act 1863. However provision was made for Ngāti Mutunga people who had not rebelled by the returning of 9,000 acres of land and later in 1870 a further 15,000 acres. The land was returned to individuals. The later land was mainly inland and most was sold. It is unknown how many Ngāti Mutunga existed in the rohe as many had taken part in the invasion of the Chatham Islands. Based on the present Ngāti Mutunga population of 2,000 (c. 2007) it was possibly about 200.

In 1926–27 the Sim Commission investigated various Taranaki claims and resolved that wrong had been done and awarded 5000 pounds per annum to be paid. It is claimed that this was paid irregularly during the 1930s economic depression. In 2005–06 a Deed of Settlement to settle outstanding Treaty of Waitangi issues was signed by Ngāti Mutunga after being endorsed by 95% of those Ngāti Mutunga eligible to vote. This settlement awarded $14.9 million and 10 areas of land of cultural significance to Ngāti Mutunga.

Treaty of Waitangi claims settlement for Chatham Islands
On 25 November 2022, Ngāti Mutunga o Wharekauri and the New Zealand Government/Crown signed an "agreement in principle" for settlement of historical Treaty of Waitangi claims. The Crown acknowledged that it had failed to consult the iwi/tribe during its annexation of the Chathams Islands in 1842. The "agreement in principle" includes a financial redress of NZ$13 million, the option to transfer culturally significant lands to the iwi as "cultural redress," and shared redress between the iwi and Moriori.

Organisations

 Te Korimako O Taranaki is the radio station of Ngāti Mutunga and other Taranaki region iwi, including Ngāti Tama, Te Atiawa, Ngati Maru, Taranaki, Ngāruahine, Ngāti Ruanui, Ngaa Rauru Kiitahi. It started at the Bell Block campus of Taranaki Polytechnic in 1992, and moved to the Spotswood campus in 1993.
 Ngāti Mutunga o Wharekauri Iwi Trust has a mandate recognised by the New Zealand Government to represent Ngāti Mutunga on Chatham Islands during Treaty of Waitangi settlement negotiations. The trust is also a mandated iwi organisation under the Māori Fisheries Act 2004, an iwi aquaculture organisation under the Māori Commercial Aquaculture Claims Settlement Act 2004, a Tūhono organisation, and represents the Chatham Islands branch of the iwi as an iwi authority under the Resource Management Act. The trust is a common law trust, and is governed by one representative from the North Island, one representative from the South Island and five representatives from the Chatham Islands. , the trust chair is Deena Whaitiri.

Notable iwi members

 George Bertrand – soldier
 Christine Harvey – tā moko artist
 Te Rangi Hīroa – doctor, military leader, health administrator, politician, anthropologist and museum director
 Rachel House – actress
 Miriama Kamo – journalist, TV presenter
 Māui Pōmare – doctor and politician
 Howie Tamati – rugby league player and coach, politician
 Kevin Tamati – rugby league player and coach
 Kahe Te Rau-o-te-rangi – leader, trader and innkeeper
 Brendon Tuuta – rugby league player

See also
List of Māori iwi

References

External links
 Ngāti Mutunga website
 Ngāti Mutunga o Wharekauri Iwi Trust website

 
Iwi and hapū